A constitutional referendum was held in Armenia on 25 May 2003. The constitutional changes would remove some powers from the president, and were narrowly approved by 50.56% of voters, with a 52.10% turnout. However, the results were invalidated, as the number of votes in favour of the changes was lower than one-third of the number of registered voters (778,331).

Results

References

2003 referendums
2003 in Armenia
2003
Constitutional referendums
Constitutional history of Armenia
2000s in Armenian politics